Lucien Olieslagers (born 25 November 1936 - Died 29 May 2021) was a Belgian football player who won the Belgian Golden Shoe in 1959 while at Lierse. He never played for the national team.

References

Belgian footballers
Lierse S.K. players
1936 births
Living people

Association footballers not categorized by position